Ugia mediorufa is a species of moth in the family Erebidae. It is found in India (Naga).

References

Moths described in 1894
Ugia
Moths of Asia